Chesterton was a rural district in Cambridgeshire, England from 1894 to 1974.

It was formed in 1894 as a successor to the Chesterton rural sanitary district.  In 1934, under a County Review Order, its boundaries were altered, taking in the disbanded Swavesey Rural District and part of the disbanded Caxton and Arrington Rural District.  It also ceded an area to the borough of Cambridge.

In 1965 it became part of the new administrative county of Cambridgeshire and the Isle of Ely.

The district was abolished in 1974 under the Local Government Act 1972, and merged with the South Cambridgeshire Rural District to form a new South Cambridgeshire district.

Parishes

References 
A Vision of Britain through time: Chesterton RD

Districts of England created by the Local Government Act 1894
Districts of England abolished by the Local Government Act 1972
History of Cambridgeshire
Rural districts of England